Casey Stegall is an American journalist who is a network correspondent for the Fox News Channel.

In 2007, he won the Outstanding Reporter of the Year award from the Headliners Foundation.

References 

Living people
American television reporters and correspondents
Associated Press reporters
Fox News people
1979 births
People from Evansville, Indiana
Ball State University alumni
Date of birth missing (living people)